Elmhurst is a historic home located at Fredericksburg, Virginia. It was built in 1871, and is a two-story, three-bay, double-pile, "L"-plan, brick dwelling in the Italianate style. It is topped by a hipped roof over a low-pitched, pyramidal and shed roof with a large belvedere and eaves supported by large, elaborate brackets. It has a -story kitchen wing added in 1900 and a -story addition and porch built between 1912 and 1921.

It was listed on the National Register of Historic Places in 2008.

References

Houses on the National Register of Historic Places in Virginia
Italianate architecture in Virginia
Houses completed in 1871
Houses in Fredericksburg, Virginia
National Register of Historic Places in Fredericksburg, Virginia